Martina Maggio (born July 26, 2001) is an Italian artistic gymnast.  She represented Italy at the 2020 Olympic Games.  She was a member of the gold medal winning teams at the 2022 Mediterranean Games and the 2022 European Championships. She was also the alternate for the team who won bronze at the 2019 World Championships in Stuttgart.  Individually she is the 2022 Mediterranean Games all-around champion, the 2022 European all-around bronze medalist, the 2022 European silver medalist on floor, and 2016 European junior vault champion.

Early life
Martina Maggio was born in Villasanta, Italy on July 26, 2001. In 2014, she moved to Brescia to train at the International Academy of Brixia.

Gymnastics career

Junior

2014 
Maggio competed at the Golden League where she placed 16th in the all-around and sixth on the balance beam.  Maggio made her international debut at the Camaiore Trophy where she helped Italy place first ahead of France and Mexico.  She next competed at the Iuvenila Cup in Mexico where Italy once again won gold, this time ahead of Germany and Brazil.  Individually Maggio won gold in the all-around ahead of Thaís Fidélis, vault, uneven bars, and balance beam.  She won bronze on floor exercise.

2015 
In 2015 Maggio was selected to represent Italy at the European Youth Olympic Festival alongside Caterina Cereghetti and Francesca Linari.  Together they placed fifth in the team competition.  Individually Maggio placed 13th in the all-around, fourth on balance beam, and eighth on floor exercise. She later competed at the Elite Gym Massilia where she helped Italy place fifth and she placed 17th in the all-around.

2016 
Maggio competed at the first and second Italian Serie A2 competitions, winning silver in the all-around at both.  She next competed at the City of Jesolo Trophy where she placed seventh in the all-around.  During event finals she placed second on vault behind Jordan Chiles, second on balance beam behind Emma Malabuyo, and third on floor exercise behind Trinity Thomas and Malabuyo.  Maggio next competed at the third and fourth Italian Serie A2 competitions where she placed first and second respectively.

Maggio competed at a friendly competition amongst junior competitors where she placed third in the all-around behind Alice Kinsella of Great Britain and compatriot Giorgia Villa.  Maggio was selected to represent Italy at the 2016 European Championships.  While there she helped Italy place fourth in the team competition.  Individually Maggio won gold on vault ahead of compatriot Martina Basile and Denisa Golgotă of Romania.

Senior

2017 
Maggio turned senior in 2017.  She made her debut at the 2017 City of Jesolo Trophy where she placed twenty-fourth.  She next competed in the 2nd Italian Serie A where she placed first.  She was later selected to represent Italy at the European Championships.  While there she qualified to the All-Around final where she finished in sixth place.  She competed at the next Italian Serie A competition and once again finished in first place.  Maggio continued her dominance, winning the Italian Gold Championships and placing first on three of the four apparatuses.  Maggio was poised to compete at the World Championships, however she sustained a knee injury while training that ended her season prematurely.

2018 
Maggio returned to competition in June, competing at the 3rd Italian Serie A where she finished 8th in the all-around.  The following month she competed at the Italian National Championships where she placed fourth in the all-around, won gold on balance beam, and placed fifth and sixth on uneven bars and floor exercise respectively.  Later that month Maggio re-injured her knee and would be unable to compete at the European Championships nor the World Championships.

2019
Maggio returned to competition at the 2019 City of Jesolo Trophy.  She placed 17th in the all-around and fifth on balance beam.  She competed at the Italian National Championships where she won silver on balance beam behind Giorgia Villa.  She placed sixth in the all-around and on uneven bars and floor exercise.  On September 4 Maggio was named as the alternate for the team to compete at the 2019 World Championships in Stuttgart, Germany.

At the team final Italy won the bronze medal – Italy's first team medal since the 1950 World Artistic Gymnastics Championships.  As the alternate, Maggio was also awarded the medal.

2020–21 
Maggio competed at various Serie A competitions in the beginning of 2020; however most competitions were canceled or postponed due to the worldwide COVID-19 pandemic.  In November Maggio competed at the Italian National Championships.  She finished third in the all-around behind Giorgia Villa and Asia D'Amato. During event finals she won gold on balance beam, silver on uneven bars behind Villa, and placed sixth on floor exercise.

Maggio competed at the 1st Italian Serie A of 2021 where she placed first.  In April Maggio was selected to represent Italy at the European Championships in Basel alongside Alice D'Amato, Giorgia Villa, and Vanessa Ferrari.  Maggio qualified to the all-around, balance beam, and floor exercise event finals.  During the all-around final Maggio finished in sixth place.  During the apparatus event finals Maggio finished fifth on balance beam and fourth on floor exercise.

Maggio was named to the team to represent Italy at the 2020 Summer Olympics alongside Alice and Asia D'Amato and Giorgia Villa (later replaced by Vanessa Ferrari).The team qualified for the team finals and placed fourth with a total score of 163.638.

2022 

Maggio competed at the DTB Pokal Team Challenge.  Her scores on vault, balance beam, and floor exercise contributed towards Italy's second-place finish.  Individually she won silver on balance beam behind Konnor McClain.  Maggio next competed at the City of Jesolo Trophy.  She helped Italy finish second as a team and individually placed third in the all-around behind McClain and Asia D'Amato.  During event finals she once again finished second on balance beam behind McClain.  In June Maggio competed at the Mediterranean Games alongside Angela Andreoli, Alice D'Amato, Asia D'Amato, and Giorgia Villa.  Together they won gold in the team competition, over five points ahead of second place France.  Individually Maggio won gold in the all-around.

Maggio next competed at the European Championships.  On the first day of competition she won bronze in the all-around behind compatriot Asia D'Amato and Alice Kinsella of Great Britain.  Additionally Maggio helped Italy qualify to the team final in first place and individually she qualified to the floor exercise final.  During the team final Maggio contributed scores on vault, balance beam, and floor exercise towards Italy's first place finish.  After teammate Asia D'Amato was injured during the vault final, Maggio was substituted into the balance beam final where she finished fourth.  During the floor exercise final Maggio finished second behind reigning European floor exercise champion Jessica Gadirova.

In October Maggio competed at the Italian National Championships.  She placed first in the all-around, on uneven bars (tied with Villa), on balance beam, and on floor exercise.  She was later named to the team to compete at the World Championships in Liverpool alongside Giorgia Villa, Alice D'Amato, Manila Esposito, Veronica Mandriota, and alternate Elisa Iorio.  While there she helped Italy finish fifth as a team.  Individually Maggio qualified to the all-around final and was a reserve athlete for the uneven bars and floor exercise finals.  She finished ninth in the all-around and was able to compete in the floor exercise final after teammate D'Amato withdrew; she finished fifth.  Maggio next competed at the Swiss Cup alongside Nicola Bartolini.  While there they finished second behind the American duo of Addison Fatta and Yul Moldauer.

2023 
Maggio competed at the Cottbus World Cup where she finished fifth on the balance beam.

Competitive history

References

External links
 

2001 births
Living people
Italian female artistic gymnasts
Medalists at the World Artistic Gymnastics Championships
Sportspeople from the Province of Monza e Brianza
Gymnasts at the 2020 Summer Olympics
Olympic gymnasts of Italy
European champions in gymnastics
Mediterranean Games gold medalists for Italy
Mediterranean Games silver medalists for Italy
Mediterranean Games medalists in gymnastics
Gymnasts at the 2022 Mediterranean Games
21st-century Italian women